Sessions 2000 is the fourteenth studio album by French electronic musician and composer Jean-Michel Jarre, released on Disques Dreyfus and distributed by Sony Music in 2002. On January 7, 2003 was released in US. Sessions 2000 featured Francis Rimbert, and was recorded at Croissy studio and later mixed at Square Prod studio by Joachim Garraud. The album reached the 140th position in French charts.

Reception 

Billboard write that the "tracks all share a certain cinematic scope, which is not unusual for ambient tunes, but Jarre has put a good deal of effort into evoking a pensive, understated, jazz feel that, at times–particularly on “March”–is reminiscent of Miles Davis’ late work." Also added that "he's created a deeply nuanced soundscape that invites repeated listening".

Lorna Palmer from BBC commented that "the album is laced with acoustic instruments (a mix of live playing and samples) placed over a backdrop of seamless ambient electronics and soft trip hop grooves, with chilled jazzy undertones throughout." PopMatters described it as "an enjoyable and very listenable experience." Amy Hanson of AllMusic stated that "Jarre's six-track view of a year is energetic, invigorating, and after-dinner-drink smooth."

Track listing

Equipment
Equipment instruments used in the album:
 Roland XP-80
 Eminent 310U
 ARP 2600
 Minimoog
 Korg KARMA
 Novation Digital Music Systems Supernova II
 microKORG
 Roland JP-8000
 Korg Mini Pops 7
 Digisequencer
 E-mu Systems XL7
 Roland Handsonic
 EMS Synthi AKS
 EMS VCS 3
 RMI Harmonic Synthesizer

Charts

References

Further reading

External links 
 Sessions 2000 at Discogs

2002 albums
Jean-Michel Jarre albums